The Scarritt Building and Arcade is a historic building in Kansas City, Missouri. It was built in 1906. It was designed by Root & Siemens. It has been listed on the National Register of Historic Places since March 9, 1971.

References

Buildings and structures on the National Register of Historic Places in Missouri
National Register of Historic Places in Jackson County, Missouri
Chicago school architecture in Missouri
Buildings and structures completed in 1906
1906 establishments in Missouri